James Lawrence Paterson,  is an Australian Paralympic skier who has cerebral palsy.

Personal life
Paterson was from Terrigal, New South Wales and a marine mechanic for Halvorsen Boats. After the 1994 Games, Paterson thanked the Terrigal community and his employer for supporting his overseas preparation.

Skiing career
At the 1994 Lillehammer Winter Paralympics, Paterson competed in four events and won a silver medal in the Men's Downhill LW9 event and a bronze medal in the Men's Giant Slalom LW9 event. In 1996, at the IPC Alpine Skiing World Championships, he won a silver medal and two bronze medals. At the 1998 Winter Paralympics, he was team captain and competed in four events. He won a gold medal in the Men's Downhill LW1,3,5/7,9 event and a bronze medal in the Men's Slalom LW9 event Between 1997 and 1999, he was an Australian Institute of Sport Athlete with a Disability scholarship holder. His last major international competition was the 2000 IPC Alpine Skiing World Championships, where he won a silver medal in the Men's Giant Slalom LW1,3,7,7,9.  He announced his retirement in June 2001 citing his lost passion and the cost of competing on his family and finances.

Recognition
In 2000, Paterson received an Australian Sports Medal. In 2008, he was awarded a Medal of the Order of Australia in recognition for being a medallist at Paralympics and Disabled World Ski Championships. He has been inducted into the Central Coast Sporting Hall of Fame.

Paterson is married to Martina, and has two children, Emily and Cameron.

References

Bibliography
 
 

Australian male alpine skiers
Paralympic alpine skiers of Australia
Alpine skiers at the 1994 Winter Paralympics
Alpine skiers at the 1998 Winter Paralympics
Paralympic gold medalists for Australia
Paralympic silver medalists for Australia
Paralympic bronze medalists for Australia
Recipients of the Australian Sports Medal
Members of the Order of Australia
Australian Institute of Sport Paralympic skiers
Cerebral Palsy category Paralympic competitors
Living people
Medalists at the 1994 Winter Paralympics
Medalists at the 1998 Winter Paralympics
Year of birth missing (living people)
Paralympic medalists in alpine skiing
People from the Central Coast (New South Wales)
Sportsmen from New South Wales